Junk Girl is a 2014 Iranian animated film created in Tabriz by Shalale Kheiri and Mohammad Zare. The animation is an adaptation of the namesake poem from Tim Burton's The Melancholy Death of Oyster Boy & Other Stories. To date, this animation has been nominated for awards in several different film festivals around the world. Junk Girl was also screened in Tehran's International Short Film Festival.

Synopsis
There was once a girl who was made of junk. She looked dirty, and smelled like a skunk. She was unhappy and spent a lot of time at the dumps. But, there was a light in her life, and that was a man who liked her a lot. But she made a decision a bit too harsh.

References

Iranian animated films
Stop-motion animated short films
Tim Burton
2014 animated films
2014 films